Arkadiusz Gmur (born 15 October 1966 in Poland) is a Polish retired footballer.

Career

In 1991, Gmur helped Legia Warsaw, the most successful Polish team, beat Italian Serie A side Sampdoria and reach the semi-finals of that years European Cup Winners' Cup, where they lost  1–3 to English top flight club Manchester United.

In 1994, he signed for Aarhus Gymnastikforening in the Danish top flight, before playing for Danish lower league outfits Herning Fremad and Holstebro Boldklub.

In 1992, Gmur made his solitary appearance for the Poland national team, in a 2-2 friendly draw with Guatemala.

References

External links
 

Polish footballers
Living people
1966 births
Association football defenders
Poland international footballers
Footballers from Warsaw
Legia Warsaw players
Aarhus Gymnastikforening players